Egon Larsen (13 July 1904 - 17 October 1990) was a German science journalist and writer.

Larsen was born in Munich. He was the author of many books, due to persecution from Nazism he moved to live in Prague and to London in 1938.

Publications

Men Who Changed The World Stories of Invention and Discovery (1952)
Men Under the Sea (1955)
You'll See: Report from the Future (1957)
Atomic Energy: A Layman's Guide to the Nuclear Age (1958)
Ideas and Invention (1960)
The Cavendish Laboratory: Nursery of Genius (1962)
Atoms and Atomic Energy (1963)
Men Who Fought for Freedom (1963)
Inventors (1965)
The Deceivers: Lives of the Great Imposters (1966)
Great Humorous Stories of the World (1967)
First with the Truth: Newspapermen in Action (1968)
A History of Inventions (1969)
Great Ideas in Engineering (1970)
Strange Sects and Cults: A Study of Their Origins and Influence (1972)
Weimar Eyewitness (1976)
New Sources of Energy and Power (1976)
Telecommunications: A History (1977)
A Flame in Barbed Wire: The Story of Amnesty International (1978)
Wit as a Weapon: The Political Joke in History (1980)

References

1904 births
1990 deaths
German male writers
20th-century German journalists